Coleophora ciliataephaga is a moth of the family Coleophoridae. It is found in Spain.

The larvae feed on Maireana ciliata. They create a tubular silken case of 4.5–6 mm with a mouth angle of 65°. The case mostly has a light sand colour, but often it is almost white. The wall contains many sand grains. The rear half of the case has some folds that are lighter in colour and contain much less sand grains. Cases can be found from early May to mid-June.

References

ciliataephaga
Moths described in 1978
Moths of Europe